Loharu State was one of the princely states of India during the period of the British Raj. It was part of the Punjab States Agency and was a nine-gun salute state.

In 1901, the state had a population of 15,229 people, of whom 2,175 resided in the town of Loharu. From 1803 to 1835, the territory of Loharu State also included an Ferozepur Jhirka enclave within the area directly administered by the British raj, Outer limits of the state were defined by the peripheral towns of Loharu, Bahal, Isharwal, Kairu, Jui Khurd and Badhra.

The haveli of 'Nawab of Loharu', known as Mahal Sara, lies in Gali Qasim Jan in Ballimaran, where his son-in-law, noted poet Mirza Ghalib stayed for a few years, whose own Ghalib ki Haveli lies a few yard away. Now the gali, which houses the Mahal Sara, is known as Kothi Nawab Loharu lane in Ballimaran mohalla of Chandni Chowk area in Old Delhi.

History

Loharu town, the seat of the state's administration town got its name from the Lohars (local blacksmiths) who were employed in the minting of coins for the erstwhile Jaipur State. The princely state of Loharu was founded by Ahmad Baksh Khan in 1803 when he received the town of Loharu, (along with the pargana of 'Firozepur Jirka' (now in Nuh district), from the Lord Lake of British East India Company as a reward for his services against the Jat rulers of Bharatpur.

Ahmad Baksh Khan was succeeded by his eldest son, Sams-ud-din Khan [Samsudin Ahmad Khan], in 1827;  his reign did not last long: in 1835 he was executed by the British Raj for being involved in the conspiracy to kill the British Resident to Delhi, Sir William Frazer, Noted Urdu poet Daagh Dehlvi was a son of Nawab Samsuddin Khan.  subsequently the pargana of Firozepur was taken away by the British and the state of Loharu was given to his brothers, Amin-ud-din and Zia-ud-din Khan. Both were themselves kept under surveillance after the Indian Rebellion of 1857 for some time, before being released and their positions restored.

Alauddin Ahmed Khan succeeded his father Amin-ud-din Khan in 1869 and received the title of Nawab. Alauddin's son, Amir-ud-din Ahmad Khan (1859–1937), after managing the state on his father's behalf, succeed him in 1884, though from 1893 to 1903, he remained administrator and adviser of the state of Maler Kotla during this time, the state was being handled by his younger brother, Bashiruddin Ahmed Khan. In 1903, Amir- ud-din Ahmad Khan also received the K.C.S.I honour from the British Government and after the 1903 Durbar Honours from 1 January 1903 was allowed a 9 gun personal salute. He later became a member of the Viceroy of India's legislative council. The Nawab of Loharu State dealt with the dissenting kisans (farmers) and his troops opened fire on a Kisan Meeting on 8 August 1935, killing dozens of kisans.

In 1920, he abdicated to his second son, Aizzuddin Ahmad Khan, though he died early in 1926, leaving the state to his son, Amin ud-din Ahmad Khan (1911–1983) - the last Nawab. However, since the new Nawab was still young, Amirud-din Ahmad Khan stepped in and took care of the state till 1931.

After the Independence of India in 1947, the state acceded to the Union of India and many of the ruling family and the city's Muslim inhabitants re-settled in Lahore, Pakistan, though the Nawab and his direct descendants (except for the eldest daughter of Nawab Aminuddin Ahmed, Mahbano Begum who lives in Islamabad), stayed on, in India.

Nawabs of Loharu

Notable members of the Loharu dynasty
The ruling family of Loharu was linked by blood or marriage to several important Muslim personalities of the 19th century, including:
 Mirza Ghalib (1796 — 1869), renowned Urdu and Persian poet, married Umrao Begum, daughter of Nawab Ilahi Bakhsh Khan (younger brother of the first Nawab, Ahmad Baksh Khan).
 Daagh Dehlvi (1831 – 1905), a noted Urdu poet was a son of second Nawab, Shamsuddin Ahmad Khan.
 Syed Ahmed Khan (1817 – 1898), educationist KCSI
 Fakhruddin Ali Ahmed (1905–1977), President of India (1974–1977)
 Ibrahim Ali Khan Pataudi (r. 1913–1917), Nawab of Pataudi, married Shahar Bano Begum, daughter of Nawab Amiruddin Ahmad Khan.

Courtiers
Jaglan Zail of Bidhwan was adjacent to the Loharu State.

Mir Muhammad Khan, was a fine vocalist in the court of Maharaja Loharu, a descendant of Mir Allahbux who a famous vocalists and the court-musician of Raja Nahar Singh of Ballabhgarh State.

Post-Independence

Loharu descendants in India
 Amin ud-din Ahmad Khan, the last ruling Nawab: Served in the Indian Army, seeing action during the liberation of Portuguese India in 1961. He was later elected to the Legislative Assembly of Rajasthan state, and ended his chequered career as the governor of Himachal Pradesh (1977–1981) and governor of Punjab (1981–1982).
 Ala-uddin Ahmad Khan II (Born 1938): After staying in Kolkata for many year, he now lives in Loharu town; where the Loharu fort, now in ruins, stands in its center, and a major tourist attraction
 Aimaduddin Ahmad Khan, or 'Durru Mian' (Born 1944) married to Fauzia Ahmad Khan: Indian National Congress politician, member Legislative Assembly of Rajasthan, Health Minister Of Rajasthan state, settled in Jaipur
 Noor Bano (Born 1939): Married to Syed Zulfiqar Ali Khan of Rampur (Titular Nawab of Rampur), and a member 11th Lok Sabha and 13th Lok Sabha.

Loharu descendants in Pakistan
 Jamiluddin Aali, (20 January 1925 – 23 November 2015), Urdu poet, playwright.
 Mahbano Begum, (born 1934, Loharu), eldest daughter of Nawab Aminuddin Ahmad Khan, married to H. E. Dr. S. M. Koreshi, Ambassador of Pakistan.
Junaid Jamshed, (died 2016, Havelian) son of granddaughter of last Nawab of Loharu, Pakistani Artist and Personality

Adjacent states and jagirs
 Jind State, bordering south east
 Patiala State, bordering south
 Jaglan Zail of Bidhwan, bordering north was directly administered by the British raj.

Demographics

Religion 
{| class="wikitable sortable mw-collapsible"
|+ Religion in Loharu State (1941)
|-
! Religion
! Population
! Percentage
|-
| Hinduism 
| 23,923
|
|-
| Islam  
| 3,960
|
|-
| Sikhism 
| 7
|
|-
| Others
| 2
|
|-
| Total Population
| 27,892
| 
|}

See also
 History of Haryana
 List of princely states of British India

 Notes 

References

 External links 

Genealogy of the Nawabs of Loharu Queensland University''

Princely states of India
Princely states of Punjab
History of Punjab
Muslim princely states of India
Bhiwani district
1806 establishments in India
1947 disestablishments in India